Pejman Poshtam (born 11 January 1994) is an Iranian Greco-Roman wrestler. He is a bronze medalist at the World Wrestling Championships and a two-time medalist, including gold, at the Asian Wrestling Championships.

Career 

At the 2017 Asian Indoor and Martial Arts Games held in Ashgabat, Turkmenistan, he won the gold medal in the 75 kg event. In 2018, he competed in the 77 kg event at the World Wrestling Championships where he was eliminated in his first match by Dmytro Pyshkov of Ukraine.

In 2019, he represented Iran at the Military World Games held in Wuhan, China and he won the gold medal in the 77 kg event. In the final, he defeated Hasan Aliyev of Azerbaijan. In 2020, he won the silver medal in the 77 kg event at the Asian Wrestling Championships held in New Delhi, India.

He competed in the 82kg event at the 2022 World Wrestling Championships held in Belgrade, Serbia.

Achievements

References

External links 

 

Living people
1994 births
Place of birth missing (living people)
Iranian male sport wrestlers
Asian Wrestling Championships medalists
World Wrestling Championships medalists
21st-century Iranian people